The following article presents a summary of the 1997 football (soccer) season in Brazil, which was the 96th season of competitive football in the country.

Campeonato Brasileiro Série A

Second phase

Final

Relegation
The four worst placed teams, which are Bahia, Criciúma, Fluminense and União São João, were relegated to the following year's second level.

Campeonato Brasileiro Série B

América Mineiro declared as the Campeonato Brasileiro Série B champions.

Promotion
The two best placed teams in the final stage of the competition, which are América-MG and Ponte Preta, were promoted to the following year's first level.

Relegation
The worst placed team in each one of the five groups in the first stage, which are Moto Club, Central, Sergipe, Giatuba and Mogi Mirim, were relegated to the following year's third level.

Campeonato Brasileiro Série C

Sampaio Corrêa declared as the Campeonato Brasileiro Série C champions.

Promotion
The two best placed teams in the final stage of the competition, which are Sampaio Corrêa and Juventus, were promoted to the following year's second level.

Copa do Brasil

The Copa do Brasil final was played between Grêmio and Flamengo.

Grêmio declared as the cup champions on the away goal rule by aggregate score of 2-2.

Regional and state championship champions

Regional championship champions

State championship champions

Other competition champions

Brazilian clubs in international competitions

Brazil national team
The following table lists all the games played by the Brazil national football team in official competitions and friendly matches during 1997.

Women's football

Brazil women's national football team
The following table lists all the games played by the Brazil women's national football team in official competitions and friendly matches during 1997.

Domestic competition champions

References

 Brazilian competitions at RSSSF
 1997 Brazil national team matches at RSSSF
 1997-1999 Brazil women's national team matches at RSSSF

 
Seasons in Brazilian football
Brazil